Arthur D. Kelly (June 9, 1873 in St. Croix County, Wisconsin – September 25, 1939), was a member of the Wisconsin State Assembly. He graduated from Hudson High School in Hudson, Wisconsin in 1892. Kelly was a farmer and livestock dealer.

Career
Kelly was a member of the Assembly from 1933 until his death. Additionally, he was Chairman of Hudson and of the St. Croix County Board. He was affiliated with the Republican Party and the Wisconsin Progressive Party.

References

People from Hudson, Wisconsin
Farmers from Wisconsin
County supervisors in Wisconsin
Republican Party members of the Wisconsin State Assembly
Wisconsin Progressives (1924)
20th-century American politicians
1873 births
1939 deaths